Soyuz TMA-8 was a Soyuz mission to the International Space Station (ISS)  launched by a Soyuz FG launch vehicle.

Crew

Soyuz TMA-8 was a transport mission for portions of the International Space Station (ISS) Expedition 13 crew.  The flight delivered ISS Commander Pavel Vinogradov and ISS Flight Engineer Jeffrey Williams to the station to replace Expedition 12 crew members.  Flight Engineer Marcos Pontes joined the TMA-8 crew for the ascent and docking with ISS, spent approximately seven days aboard the ISS conducting experiments as part of the Missão Centenário, then returned to Earth with the outgoing members of Expedition 12 aboard Soyuz TMA-7.  Vinogradov and Williams were joined on their return trip to Earth by Spaceflight Participant Anousheh Ansari who launched aboard Soyuz TMA-9 and spent approximately eight days aboard ISS conducting experiments for the European Space Agency.

Back-up crew

Docking with ISS
Docked to ISS: April 1, 2006, 04:19 UTC (to nadir port of Zarya)
Undocked from ISS: September 28, 2006, 21:53 UTC (from nadir port of Zarya)

Mission highlights

29th crewed flight to ISS (Flight 12S)

Soyuz TMA-8 is a Soyuz spacecraft which was launched on March 30, 2006 by a Soyuz-FG rocket from the Baikonur Cosmodrome.  Near the end of second stage burn, a communications blackout occurred at Moscow Mission Control.  A satellite link was lost, but was restored about 10 minutes later.  The crew was safe throughout the loss of communications.

The spacecraft carried two members of the Expedition 13 crew to the International Space Station, together with Marcos Pontes, the first Brazilian in space. The Brazilian government paid Russia approximately $20 million (USD) for Pontes' flight. They replaced the Expedition 12 crew, Commander William McArthur and Valery Ivanovich Tokarev. Together with the Expedition 12 crew, Marcos Pontes returned to Earth on board Soyuz TMA-7.

Soyuz TMA-8 returned to Earth, together with Expedition 13, the spaceflight participant launched with Soyuz TMA-9, Anousheh Ansari.

See also

List of spaceflights (2006)

References

External links
Expedition 13/Soyuz TMA-8

Crewed Soyuz missions
Spacecraft launched in 2006
Orbital space tourism missions
Spacecraft which reentered in 2006
Spacecraft launched by Soyuz-FG rockets